The William A. Glasner House, is a Frank Lloyd Wright designed Prairie School home that was constructed in Glencoe, Illinois, United States, in 1905. Glasner led his sister, Emma Pettit, to Wright to design the Pettit Memorial Chapel as a memorial to her deceased husband, Dr. William H. Pettit.

The house was threatened with demolition by a real estate developer, but the Frank Lloyd Wright Building Conservancy helped locate a conservation-minded buyer who ultimately purchased the house. It is a 4,300 square feet, four-bedroom, three-bathroom house and sits on a one-acre lot. Jack Reed bought the house in 2003 for $1.5 million and spent $2.5 million restoring it.

References

 Storrer, William Allin. The Frank Lloyd Wright Companion. University Of Chicago Press, 2006,  (S.109)

External links

Glasner House on Historic American Buildings Survey
Glasner House on waymarking.com
Photos on Flickr
Glasner House on peterbeers.net
Exterior photographs of Glasner house

Frank Lloyd Wright buildings
Houses on the National Register of Historic Places in Cook County, Illinois
Houses completed in 1905
1905 establishments in Illinois